Amna Al Qubaisi (born 28 March 2000) is an Emirati racing driver. On 16 December 2018, she became the first Middle Eastern woman to take part in a motorsport test program for Formula E after the Diriyah ePrix in Saudi Arabia.

Personal life 
Amna was born in Washington, Virginia in the United States. She is the daughter of Khaled Al Qubaisi, CEO of Real Estate and Infrastructure Investment platform at Mubadala Investment Company and also a racing driver who was the first Emirati to compete at the 24 Hours of Le Mans race in France, claiming two class podiums. She is the first Emirati woman to participate in motorsports with Daman Speed Academy and compete internationally. She is also Hamda Al Qubaisi's older sister. Amna attends Sorbonne University Abu Dhabi, completing a degree in physics and her interests include partying, clubbing, karting, gymnastics, and jet skiing.

Career

Karting 
Amna began her karting career in 2014 at the age of fourteen. She was the first Arab woman to participate at the Rotax Max Challenge (RMC) World Finals. Two years later she began competing internationally claiming top 10 finishes. In 2017, she was the first Arabic girl to win the UAE RMC Championship.  She was also the first female to be sponsored by Kaspersky Lab. She was also the first female to be selected by the ATCUAE to represent the UAE at the GCC Young Drivers Academy Programme which she won.

X30 Euro Series Wackersdorf 
Amna and her sister Hamda participated at the X30 Euro Series in Wackersdorf with Team Driver. It was Amna's first time to drive in Wackersdorf and she has showed great pace being amongst the top five in one of her heats. Amna has finished 16th overall out of 54 drivers, and she was also the only female to reach the Final.

Italian X30 Championship 
Amna has participated at the Italian X30 Championships in Adria for the first time. She ran in fifteenth until her engine failed. However she was amongst the top 20 with only 0.2 sec off the fastest time.

Formula 4 

Amna competed in the 2018 Italian F4 Championship with the championship winning Prema Powerteam. She competed in six of the seven rounds, with her highest place finish in a race being 12th. She also took part the following season, finishing 31st with no points.

Formula E test 
Amna was one of nine female drivers to take part in a test session on 16 December 2018, after the first round of the 2018-19 Formula E Season at the Ad Diriyah ePrix on a street circuit in Diriyah, Saudi Arabia. She drove for Envision Virgin Racing in an Audi-powered Formula E car in an initiative by the FIA Women in Motorsport Commission. It came less than six months after women were legally allowed to drive in Saudi Arabia for the first time.

W Series 
Al Qubaisi wanted to participate in the W Series for 2019 selection, but was unable to attend because the date interfered with her school obligations.

Formula Regional 
Al Qubaisi took the place of her sister Hamda for the Barcelona round with Prema Racing, in the 2022 Formula Regional European Championship.

Karting record

Karting career summary

Racing record

Racing career summary 

† As she was a guest driver, Al Qubaisi was ineligible to score points.

* Season still in progress.

Complete Italian F4 Championship results
(key) (Races in bold indicate pole position) (Races in italics indicate fastest lap)

Complete Formula Regional Asian Championship results
(key) (Races in bold indicate pole position) (Races in italics indicate the fastest lap of top ten finishers)

Complete Formula Regional European Championship results 
(key) (Races in bold indicate pole position) (Races in italics indicate fastest lap)

† As Amna was a guest driver, he was ineligible to score points.

Complete Formula Winter Series results 
(key) (Races in bold indicate pole position; races in italics indicate fastest lap)

References

External links 
 Official website (archived)
 Profile on Racing Driver Directory
 

2000 births
Living people
Emirati racing drivers
People from Washington, Virginia
Italian F4 Championship drivers
F3 Asian Championship drivers
Formula Regional Asian Championship drivers
Prema Powerteam drivers
Formula Regional European Championship drivers
UAE F4 Championship drivers
Iron Lynx drivers
Emirati female racing drivers
F1 Academy drivers
MP Motorsport drivers